Bobosaurus is an extinct genus of sauropterygian reptile related to plesiosaurs. It is based on the holotype MFSN 27285, a partial skeleton found in Early Carnian-age rocks (early Late Triassic) of the Rio del Lago Formation, northeastern Italy. Bobosaurus was named in 2006 by Fabio M. Dalla Vecchia and the type species is B. forojuliensis. It may be a pistosaurid, or closer to Plesiosauria. A recent cladistic analysis found it to be a pistosaur.

See also

 Timeline of plesiosaur research
 List of plesiosaur genera

References

Fossil taxa described in 2006
Plesiosaurs of Europe
Sauropterygians
Triassic sauropterygians
Sauropterygian genera